Leroy Jenkins (March 11, 1932 – February 24, 2007) was an American composer and violinist/violist.

Early life
Jenkins was born in Chicago, Illinois, United States. As a youth, he lived with his sister, his
mother, two aunts, his grandmother, and, on occasions, a boarder, in a three-bedroom apartment. Jenkins was immersed in music from an early age, and recalled listening to Charlie Parker, Dizzy Gillespie, and singers such as Billy Eckstine and Louis Jordan. When Jenkins was around eight years old, one of his aunts brought home a boyfriend who played the violin. After hearing him play a difficult Hungarian dance, Jenkins begged his mother for a violin, and was given a red, half-size Montgomery Ward violin that cost twenty-five dollars. He began taking lessons, and was soon heard at St. Luke's Baptist Church, where he was frequently accompanied on piano by Ruth Jones, later known as Dinah Washington. Jenkins eventually joined the church choir and orchestra, and performed on the violin at church banquets, teas, and social events.

As a teenager, Jenkins entered DuSable High School, where he switched to clarinet and alto saxophone due to the fact that the school did not have an orchestra, limiting his opportunities to play the violin. During this time, he came under the influence of bandleader "Captain" Walter Dyett. After graduating, Jenkins attended Florida A&M University, where he resumed study of the violin. In 1961, he graduated with a degree in music education, then moved to Mobile, Alabama, where he taught music in the public school system for four years.

Career
In the mid-1960s, Jenkins moved back to Chicago, and took a job in the public school system. At one point, he attended an AACM event featuring music by Roscoe Mitchell, performed by Maurice McIntyre, Charles Clark, Malachi Favors, Alvin Fielder, and Thurman Barker. Jenkins recalled being both confused and excited, and was thrilled to be included in a collective improvisation after taking out his violin. He began participating in AACM rehearsals led by Muhal Richard Abrams, recalling: "it was something different, something where I could really be violinistic... I discovered that I would be able to play more of my instrument and I wouldn't have to worry about the cliches... I found out that I could really soar, I found out how I could really play." Jenkins would rehearse and perform with the group for roughly four years, and made his recording debut in 1967 on Abrams's Levels and Degrees of Light.

During this time, Jenkins began playing in a trio format with fellow AACM members Anthony Braxton and Leo Smith, recording the album 3 Compositions of New Jazz in 1968. (Abrams also appears on the album.) In 1969, the trio moved to Paris, where they began playing with drummer Steve McCall, who had moved to Europe several years prior, in a group that became known as the Creative Construction Company. While in Paris, Jenkins had to opportunity to perform with a wide range of musicians, including Archie Shepp and Philly Joe Jones, with whom he recorded, Alan Silva, on whose album Luna Surface he appeared, and Ornette Coleman, who at one point organized a joint Paris concert featuring the Creative Construction Company, the Art Ensemble of Chicago, and Coleman's own group. That same year, Jenkins participated in the recording of Braxton's album B-Xo/N-0-1-47a for BYG Actuel.

In 1970, Jenkins left Paris, later stating that he didn't feel comfortable with the fact that he didn't speak French, and moved to New York City. Upon his arrival, he reconnected with Coleman and moved into Coleman's Artists House loft, where he lived for several months. He recalled: "We stayed downstairs... It was cold down there, where we slept. Ornette gave us a mattress but he didn't realize how cold it was." Coleman served as Jenkins's mentor, introducing him to the many musicians who frequented his loft. Meanwhile, Jenkins continued performing and rehearsing with the Creative Construction Company, culminating in a concert at Greenwich Village's "Peace Church" on May 19, 1970. The concert, which also featured Muhal Richard Abrams and bassist Richard Davis, was recorded thanks to Coleman, who arranged for an engineer to be present, and was released by Muse Records in two volumes.

Following the May concert, Braxton joined Chick Corea's group, which became known as Circle. Jenkins went on to form the Revolutionary Ensemble with bassist Sirone and percussionist Jerome Cooper, a group that would last roughly six years. During the early and mid-1970s, he also performed and recorded with Alice Coltrane, Don Cherry, Carla Bley, Grachan Moncur III, Rahsaan Roland Kirk, Paul Motian, Dewey Redman, and Archie Shepp. In 1974, the Jazz Composer's Orchestra commissioned Jenkins to compose a large-scale work, resulting in the album For Players Only. In 1975, he recorded Swift Are the Winds of Life, an album of duets with drummer Rashied Ali. These albums would be followed by over a dozen releases under his name over the next thirty years.

During the late 1970s, Jenkins performed and recorded with pianist/composer Anthony Davis and drummer Andrew Cyrille, and in the early 1980s, he formed a band called Sting, with two violins, two guitars, electric bass, and drums. During this time, in addition to placing in reader and critic polls in Jazz Magazine and DownBeat, he began receiving greater recognition as a composer, garnering commissions and grants from the New York State Council on the Arts, the New York Foundation for the Arts, and the National Endowment for the Arts, and performances from groups like the Kronos Quartet, the Brooklyn Philharmonic, the New Music Consort, the Pittsburgh New Music Ensemble, and the Cleveland Chamber Symphony, among others. In the late 1980s, Jenkins toured and recorded with Cecil Taylor, and received a commission from Hans Werner Henze, artistic director of the Munich Biennial New Music Theatre Festival, enabling him to compose Mother of Three Sons, a dance-opera based on African mythology, in collaboration with choreographer/director Bill T. Jones and librettist Ann T. Greene. The work was premiered in Munich in 1990, and was also performed by the New York City Opera (US premiere, 1991) and the Houston Grand Opera (1992).

The 1990s and 2000s saw a continuation of Jenkins's success as a composer. New works included Fresh Faust, a jazz-rap opera, written for Boston's Institute of Contemporary Art; The Negro Burial Ground, a cantata presented by The Kitchen and workshopped at UMass Amherst; the opera The Three Willies, presented at the Painted Bride in Philadelphia and at the Kitchen; and Coincidents an opera with librettist Mary Griffin, performed at Roulette in New York. He also participated in a reunion of the Revolutionary Ensemble, and performed and recorded with the group Equal Interest, which featured Jenkins on violin, Joseph Jarman on woodwinds, and Myra Melford on piano. He collaborated and toured with various choreographers, and formed a world-music improvisation ensemble. In 2004, he was awarded a Guggenheim Fellowship. Jenkins also held residencies at a number of American universities, including Duke, Carnegie Mellon, Williams, Brown, Harvard, and Oberlin.

Death
Jenkins died from lung cancer on February 24, 2007, in New York City, at the age of 74. At the time of his death he was working on two new operas: Bronzeville, a history of South Side Chicago, and Minor Triad, a music drama about Paul Robeson, Lena Horne, and Cab Calloway.

Discography

As leader/co-leader
 For Players Only (JCOA Records, 1975, LP)
 Swift Are the Winds of Life (Survival, 1976, LP)
 Solo Concert (India Navigation, 1977, LP)
 Lifelong Ambitions (Black Saint, 1981, LP; 1993, CD)
 The Legend of Ai Glatson (Black Saint, 1978, LP; 1993, CD)
 Space Minds, New Worlds, Survival of America (Tomato, 1979, LP; 1989, CD)
 Mixed Quintet (Black Saint, 1983, LP; 1997, CD)
 Straight Ahead/Free at Last (Red Record, 1980, LP)
 Urban Blues (Black Saint, 1984, LP; 1997, CD)
 Leroy Jenkins Live! (Black Saint, 1993, CD)
 Themes & Improvisations on the Blues (CRI eXchange, 1994, CD) with Soldier String Quartet, Henry Threadgill, Marty Ehrlich
 Out of the Mist (Ocean, 1997, CD) with Joseph Jarman
 Solo (Lovely Music, 1998, CD)
 Equal Interest (Omnitone Records, 1999, CD) as Equal Interest: with Joseph Jarman and Myra Melford
 The Art of Improvisation (Mutable Music, 2005, CD) with Driftwood

With the Revolutionary Ensemble
 Vietnam (ESP-Disk, 1972)
 Manhattan Cycles (India Navigation, 1973)
 The Psyche (RE Records, 1975)
 The Peoples Republic (A&M/Horizon, 1976)
 Revolutionary Ensemble (Enja, 1977)
 And Now... (Pi Recordings, 2004)
 Beyond the Boundary of Time (Mutable Music, 2008) 
 Counterparts (Mutable Music, 2012)

With others
With Muhal Richard Abrams
 Levels and Degrees of Light (Delmark, 1968)
 Mama and Daddy (Black Saint, 1980)

With Carla Bley
Escalator over the Hill (JCOA Records/ECM, 1971, 3LPs)
With Joe Bonner
Angel Eyes (Muse, 1976)
With Anthony Braxton
 3 Compositions of New Jazz (Delmark, 1968, LP; Delmark, 1991, CD)
 Silence (Freedom Records, 1975, LP)
 Anthony Braxton (BYG Actuel, 1969, LP)
 This Time... (BYG Actuel, 1970, LP)
 New York, Fall 1974 (Arista, 1975, LP)

With Thomas Buckner
 Sign of the Times (Lovely Music, 1994, CD)

With Don Cherry
 Relativity Suite (JCOA Records, 1973, LP)

With Alice Coltrane
 Universal Consciousness (Impulse!, 1971)
 World Galaxy (Impulse!, 1972)

With Creative Construction Company
 Creative Construction Company (Muse, 1970 [1975])
 Creative Construction Company Vol. II (Muse, 1970 [1976])

With Anthony Davis
 Of Blues and Dreams (Sackville 3032, 1979)

With James Emery
 Artlife (Lumina Records, 1982, LP)

With Carl Hancock Rux
 Apothecary Rx (Giant Step, 2004)
 Good Bread Alley (Thirsty Ear, 2006)

With Rahsaan Roland Kirk
 Rahsaan Rahsaan (Atlantic, 1970)

With George E. Lewis
 Shadowgraph (Black Saint, 1978, LP; 1998, CD)

With Grachan Moncur III
 Echoes of a Prayer (JCOA Records, 1974, LP)

With Paul Motian
 Conception Vessel (ECM, 1973)

With Mtume
 Allkebu-Lan (Land of the Blacks) at the East (Strata East, 1972, 2LPs)

With Dewey Redman
 Coincide (Impulse!, 1974)

With Jeffrey Schanzer
 Vistas (Music Vistas, 1987, LP)

With Archie Shepp
 Archie Shepp & Philly Joe Jones (Fantasy Records, 1975, LP)
 Pitchin Can (American Records, 1970, LP)
 Things Have Got to Change (Impulse Records, 1971, LP)
 Attica Blues (Impulse, 1972, LP)
 Black Gipsy (Prestige Records, 1977, LP)
 The Cry of My People (Impulse, 1973, LP)

With Alan Silva
Luna Surface (BYG, 1969)

With Cecil Taylor
 Live in Bologna, Leo Records (1988, 2 LPs; 1988, CD)
 Live in Vienna, (Leo Records, 1988, 2 LPs-Limited edition; 1991, CD)

With Henry Threadgill
 Too Much Sugar for a Dime (Axiom, 1993, CD)

Grants
 Fromm Music Foundation, Harvard University, commission, 2003
 New York State Council on the Arts, Nyasaland, 2002; Jenkins Squared, 2000
 Meet the Composer, Color Eugoloid for the Relâche Ensemble, 2002; Three Willies,  1996
  The Aaron Copland Fund for Music, Coincidents,  2002
 Ford Foundation, Three Willies, 2001 
  Animating Democracy, Americans for the Arts (funded by the Ford Foundation and the NEA), Three Willies, 2001 
  Mutable Music, brass quartet and voice piece, 1998; trio and voice piece, 1991
 Rockefeller Foundation, The Negros Burial Ground, 1996; Fresh Faust, 1992
  Mary Flagler Cary Trust, The Negros Burial Ground, 1995
 New York Foundation for the Arts, music fellowship, 1992, 1986
  Munich Biennial New Music Theatre Festival, The Mother of Three Sons, 1990
 National Endowment for the Arts, special projects grant, 1990, 1988, 1984
 National Endowment for the Arts, jazz composition fellowship, 1987, 1979, 1973
  Creative Arts Program, service grant, 1974

Awards
  The ASCAP Foundation Rudolf Nissim Prize, Concerto for Improvised Violin and Orchestra, 2006
  Nominated for United States Artists Fellowships, 2006 
 John Simon Guggenheim Memorial Foundation Fellowship, 2004
  The New York Dance and Performance Bessie Awards, The Mother of Three Sons, 1992
  Downbeat Magazine International Critics’ and Readers’ Poll, awardee, 1987, 1972
  Jazz Magazine Poll for violin, awardee, 1979
  Downbeat Magazine Talent Deserving Wider Recognition, awardee, 1974

Teaching
  Artist in Residence, California Institute of the Arts, Valencia, CA, 2002 spring
  Composer in Residence, Other Minds Festival, San Francisco, CA, 2000
  Artist in Residence, Harvestworks, New York, NY, 2000
  Master Artist in Residence, Atlantic Center for the Arts, New Smyrna Beach, FL 1993
  Artist in Residence, Atlanta Virtuosi, Atlanta, GA, 1991
  Composer in Residence, Oberlin Conservatory, Oberlin, OH, 1975 and 1990
  Visiting Professor, Carnegie-Mellon University, Pittsburgh, PA, 1989 spring

Professional memberships
  Board of Directors, Meet The Composer (founding member)
 Association for the Advancement of Creative Musicians (AACM)
 SESAC
 Atlantic Center for the Arts

Education
 Florida A&M University, Tallahassee, Florida – B. A. in Music Education (full music scholarship)
 American Conservatory of Music, Chicago, Illinois
 DuSable High School, Captain Walter Dyett, Chicago, Illinois

References

External links
 Turning Corners: The Life and Music of Leroy Jenkins by Carl E. Baugher
 Lovely Music Artist: Leroy Jenkins
 AACM: Leroy Jenkins
 Other Minds: Leroy Jenkins
 Dialogue between 'Blue' Gene Tyranny and Leroy Jenkins
 Eternal Planet (Dedicated To Leroy Jenkins), composed by William Parker and featured on Billy Bang's Medicine Buddha (NoBusiness Records, 2014, CD)

African-American jazz composers
African-American jazz musicians
American jazz violinists
American male violinists
American jazz violists
Avant-garde jazz musicians
1932 births
2007 deaths
Jazz musicians from Illinois
Musicians from Chicago
Deaths from lung cancer
India Navigation artists
Red Records artists
Pi Recordings artists
Black Saint/Soul Note artists
20th-century jazz composers
20th-century American violinists
20th-century American composers
American male jazz composers
American jazz composers
20th-century American male musicians
Creative Construction Company members
Revolutionary Ensemble members
20th-century African-American musicians
21st-century African-American people
20th-century violists